The Office Wife is a 1934 British comedy film directed by George King and starring Nora Swinburne, Cecil Parker and Chili Bouchier. It was made as a quota quickie by the British subsidiary of Warner Brothers at their Teddington Studios.

Cast
 Nora Swinburne as Anne  
 Cecil Parker as Lawrence Bradley  
 Chili Bouchier as Linda  
 Percy Walsh as Simms  
 Violet Farebrother as Aunt Cynthia 
 Hamilton Keene as Gregory 
 Charles Hawtrey

References

Bibliography
 Low, Rachael. Filmmaking in 1930s Britain. George Allen & Unwin, 1985.
 Wood, Linda. British Films, 1927-1939. British Film Institute, 1986.

External links

1934 films
British comedy films
1934 comedy films
Films shot at Teddington Studios
Quota quickies
Films directed by George King
Warner Bros. films
Films based on works by Faith Baldwin
British black-and-white films
1930s English-language films
1930s British films